Makelesi Bulikiobo Batimala (born 23 October 1977) is a Fijian sprinter.

Biography 

Nicknamed the "Sprint Queen" by the Fiji Times and Fiji Village, she has represented her country in several international competitions, including the 2004 Summer Olympics in Athens. She won four gold medals at the 2003 South Pacific Games, in the 100m, 200m, 400m and 4 × 100 m relay events. She also won the women's 200m sprint at the Australian Athletics Championships in 2008.

While taking part in the 2007 World Athletics Championships, she qualified to represent Fiji at the 2008 Summer Olympics in Beijing. She was Fiji's flag bearer at the Games' opening ceremony.

As of 2007, she held the Fiji national record for the women's 100-metre sprint, at 11.66 seconds.

Achievements

References

External links

 
 

1977 births
Living people
People educated at Lelean Memorial School
Fijian female sprinters
Athletes (track and field) at the 2002 Commonwealth Games
Commonwealth Games competitors for Fiji
Athletes (track and field) at the 2004 Summer Olympics
Athletes (track and field) at the 2008 Summer Olympics
Olympic athletes of Fiji
I-Taukei Fijian people
Sportspeople from Nadi
People educated at Suva Grammar School